Lodge is an unincorporated community in Sangamon Township, Piatt County, Illinois, United States.

Geography
Lodge is located at an elevation of 699 feet.

References

Unincorporated communities in Piatt County, Illinois
Unincorporated communities in Illinois